Doi Ian is a mountain in Thailand, part of the Phi Pan Nam Range, at the southeastern end of Chiang Rai Province limit near the point where the limit of this province meets with the northern end of Phayao Province, nine km from the border with Laos.

Location
This mountain rises in Ngao Subdistrict, Thoeng District.  
Its summit is 12 km east of Thoeng, near Ngao east of the road going from it to Wiang Kaen town. 

With a height of 1,174 metres Doi Ian is a conspicuous mountain in the surrounding landscape that can be seen from quite a distance over the plains near Thoeng town.

Climate

See also
Thai highlands
List of mountains in Thailand

References

External links
Thoeng District - GT Rider

Phi Pan Nam Range
Mountains of Thailand
Geography of Chiang Rai province